Kim Soo-young (born 5 December 1964) is a South Korean politician  who served as Mayor of Yangcheon District in Seoul and its first woman mayor from July 2014 to June of 2022.

From 2006 to 2008 she worked as the first head of Siheung's women's job center run by Ministry of Gender Equality and Family.

From 2012 to 2014 Kim was the adjunct professor of social welfare at Soongsil University.

Education 
Kim holds three degrees - a bachelor in Korean language from Ewha Womans University, a master's in social welfare policy from Sogang University and a doctorate in social welfare from Soongsil University.

Political career 
Kim was the president of student union of Ewha Womans University in late 1980s and imprisoned for student activism against authoritarian regime of Chun Doo-hwan. She then worked as a member of pro-democracy student organisation supportive of Kim Dae-jung's presidential candidacy.

She took multiple roles in her party such as a member of human rights committee of Kim Dae-jung's third presidential campaign in 1992, a director of Women's Affairs Bureau of her party, then-Uri Party, from 2004 to 2006 and vice president of Women's leadership centre of her party, then-New Politics Alliance for Democracy.

Mayor of Yangcheon District 
In 2011 Kim ran for Mayor of Yangcheon against Choo Jae-yup in the by-election held after her husband and then-mayor, Lee Jae-hak, was sentenced guilty by the Supreme Court for spreading lies about Choo, then opposing candidate, during campaign. In 2013 Choo who has served as Mayor of Yangcheon three times non-consecutively was removed from the post after the Supreme Court sentenced him guilty for Perjury during Lee's trial and breaking election law  after it is reasonable to believe Lee's "lie" that Choo actually waterboarded people while working for Army Counterintelligence Corps.

In an interview, she said she had dreamed of becoming elected official of local government and then member of National Assembly and would have run for elected post regardless of her marriage.

In 2014 Kim ran for Mayor again and won becoming the only woman among 20 democratic mayors in Seoul and the first woman to lead Yangcheon.

In 2018 Kim became the first Yangcheon Mayor to be elected twice consecutively. She is also the first woman from her party or its preceding parties to be elected twice for head of local government in South Korea.

Electoral history

References 

1964 births
Living people
Soongsil University alumni
Ewha Womans University alumni
Minjoo Party of Korea politicians
Sogang University alumni
21st-century South Korean women politicians
21st-century South Korean politicians
People from Seoul
Mayors of places in South Korea
Yangcheon District